Cameron County is a county in the Commonwealth of Pennsylvania. As of the 2020 census, the population was 4,547 and is Pennsylvania's least populous county. Its county seat is Emporium. The county was created on March 29, 1860, from parts of Clinton, Elk, McKean, and Potter Counties. It is named for Senator Simon Cameron.

Geography
It has a warm-summer humid continental climate (Dfb) and average monthly temperatures in Emporium range from 24.2 °F in January to 69.3 °F in July, while in Driftwood they range from 24.9 °F in January to 69.9 °F in July.

Adjacent counties
McKean County (north)
Potter County (northeast)
Clinton County (east)
Clearfield County (south)
Elk County (west)

Major roads

Demographics

As of the 2000 census, there were 5,974 people, 2,465 households, and 1,624 families residing in the county.  The population density was 15 people per square mile (6/km2).  There were 4,592 housing units at an average density of 12 per square mile (4/km2).  The racial makeup of the county was 98.83% White, 0.35% Black or African American, 0.13% Native American, 0.12% Asian, 0.05% Pacific Islander, 0.05% from other races, and 0.47% from two or more races.  0.57% of the population were Hispanic or Latino of any race. 26.5% were of German, 13.5% American, 13.3% Italian, 10.9% Irish, 8.2% English and 5.8% Polish ancestry.

There were 2,465 households, out of which 27.70% had children under the age of 18 living with them, 52.40% were married couples living together, 9.20% had a female householder with no husband present, and 34.10% were non-families. 30.10% of all households were made up of individuals, and 15.40% had someone living alone who was 65 years of age or older.  The average household size was 2.39 and the average family size was 2.96.

In the county, the population was spread out, with 24.50% under the age of 18, 6.00% from 18 to 24, 24.90% from 25 to 44, 24.80% from 45 to 64, and 19.80% who were 65 years of age or older.  The median age was 41 years. For every 100 females there were 96.60 males.  For every 100 females age 18 and over, there were 94.60 males.

2020 Census

Law and government

|}

Voter Registration
As of February 21, 2022, there are 3,008 registered voters in Cameron County.

 Democratic: 861 (28.62%)
 Republican: 1,773 (58.94%)
 Independent: 216 (7.18%)
 Third Party: 158 (5.25%)

County-row offices
 County Commissioners: Lori J. Reed, Chairman (R); James D. Moate (R); Ann M. Losey (D)
 Sheriff: Allen Neyman (R)
 Prothonotary/Clerk/Register/Recorder: Mary Grace Olay (R)
 Treasurer: Staci Brown (R)
 District Attorney: Paul J. Malizia (R)

State Senate
 Cris Dush, Republican, Pennsylvania's 25th Senatorial District

State House of Representatives
 Martin T. Causer, Republican, Pennsylvania's 67th Representative District

United States House of Representatives
 Glenn "G.T." Thompson, Republican, Pennsylvania's 15th congressional district

United States Senate
Bob Casey, Democrat
John Fetterman, Democrat

Education

Public school districts
 Cameron County School District

Recreation
There are three Pennsylvania state parks that are partly in Cameron County.
Bucktail State Park Natural Area is a 75-mile (121-km) scenic route along Pennsylvania Route 120 stretching from Lock Haven in Clinton County to Emporium the county seat of Cameron County. 
Sinnemahoning State Park
Sizerville State Park
both of these state parks straddle the Cameron and Potter County line.

The West Creek Rail Trail has been built on the abandoned rail corridor between Emporium and St. Mary's in Elk County. It provides a paved surface with guard rails and is suitable for hiking or biking in the warm seasons or snowmobiling in winter.

The Fred Woods Trail offers a 4.57 mile loop of blazed trail with scenic valley views and a challenging section running through unique rock formations. The trailhead is accessed off Mason Hill Road above Driftwood, PA.

Communities

Under Pennsylvania law, there are four types of incorporated municipalities: cities, boroughs, townships, and, in at most two cases, towns. The following boroughs and townships are located in Cameron County:

Boroughs
Driftwood
Emporium (county seat)

Townships
Gibson
Grove
Lumber
Portage
Shippen

Census-designated place
Prospect Park

Population ranking
The population ranking of the following table is based on the 2010 census of Cameron County.

† county seat

Notable people
Tom Mix
Joseph T. McNarney
Nate Sestina

References

External links

Official Cameron County website
 Cameron County Chamber of Commerce website
Pennsylvania Department of Transportation, Bureau of Planning and Research, Geographic Information Division, "2019 General Highway Map of Cameron County". Note: shows boroughs, townships, roads, villages, some streams.
Sizerville & Portage Township -   A website dedicated to the history of Sizerville & Portage Township, Cameron County Pennsylvania

1860 establishments in Pennsylvania
 
Counties of Appalachia
Populated places established in 1860